Oh In-hye (Korean: 오인혜; 4 January 1984 – 14 September 2020) was a South Korean actress and model.

Career 
Oh started her actress career in 2011 in the film Sin of a Family. The same year, she gained public attention during the 16th Busan International Film Festival, due to her revealing orange "sexy" dress. In 2012, she was cast in a film Marrying the Mafia V, but this fell through. In July 2019, she launched a YouTube channel.

Death 
On 14 September 2020, Oh was found unconscious at her home in Songdo International Business District, Yeonsu, Incheon. She was immediately brought to a nearby hospital, but died of cardiac arrest due to suicide. She was 36.

Filmography

Film

Television series

References

External links 
 
 
 

1984 births
2020 deaths
21st-century South Korean actresses
South Korean female models
South Korean television actresses
South Korean film actresses
People from Seoul
Female suicides
2020 suicides
Suicides in South Korea